Heliophanus africanus is a jumping spider species in the genus Heliophanus.  It was first described by Wanda Wesołowska in 1986 and is found in South Africa.

References

Endemic fauna of South Africa
Spiders described in 1986
Salticidae
Spiders of South Africa
Taxa named by Wanda Wesołowska